Buellia quarryana is a species of crustose lichen in the family Caliciaceae. Found in southeastern Australia, it was described as a new species in 2020 by lichenologists John Elix and Patrick McCarthy. The type specimen was collected from Quarry Beach in East Gippsland (Victoria), where it was found growing on siliceous rocks along the seashore. The specific epithet refers to the type locality. It has also been found on the coast of southern New South Wales.

The expected results of standard chemical spot tests for Buellia quarryana are K+ (yellow then red), C−, and PD+ (orange). The lichen contains the secondary chemicals norstictic acid (major) and connorstictic acid (trace amounts), which are detectable using thin-layer chromatography.

See also
List of Buellia species

References

quarryana
Lichen species
Lichens of Australia
Lichens described in 2020
Taxa named by John Alan Elix